Ribét Academy College Preparatory is a private, co-educational school from preschool to 12th grade located in Los Angeles, California. The school is accredited by the Accrediting Commission for Schools, Western Association of Schools and Colleges. Ribét Academy's current location was built in 1923.

Sports
In 1991, the boys' varsity basketball team won the CIF State Boys Basketball Championship - Division V. In 2019, the boys' varsity basketball team won the CIF State Boys Basketball Championship - Division IV. The following year, in 2020, the boys' varsity basketball team once again reached the State Championship game, this time in Division I; however, the game was cancelled due to COVID-19.

History
The school was founded by French-born Jacques Ribét in 1982. It has occupied three other locations around Los Angeles.

Notable alumni
 Tyler Dorsey, basketball player
 Adam G. Sevani, actor and dancer
 Mae Whitman, actress and singer

References

Boarding schools in California
Educational institutions established in 1982
Private elementary schools in California
High schools in Los Angeles
Private high schools in California
Private middle schools in California
1982 establishments in California